Dennis Junior Odunwo (born 1 September 1992), known professionally as Tion Wayne, is a British rapper and DJ from Edmonton, North London.

He appeared on three top-10 singles on UK Singles Chart as a guest – NSG's "Options", "Keisha & Becky" with Russ Millions and KSI's track "Houdini" – before getting his first top 10 hit as the lead artist with "I Dunno" featuring Dutchavelli and Stormzy, which peaked at number 7, and having his first number 1 with "Body" alongside Russ Millions.

Early life
Dennis Junior Odunwo was born in Edmonton in the Borough of Enfield, North London. His parents are from Nigeria. His mother was a nurse and his father was a computer engineer. He is a middle child and wanted to become an accountant.

Career
Odunwo began to make a name for himself in the music scene in 2010 after dropping a handful of videos on YouTube. By 2014, he had released his first mixtape, titled Wayne's World. Odunwo slowly began building a loyal following. By 2016, he had supported artists such as American rapper Rick Ross and Ghanaian artist Sarkodie. His follow-up mixtape, Wayne's World Vol. 2, was also released that year. In 2017, Odunwo released Transition EP. He made his UK Singles Chart-debut in early 2019 when he was featured on London-based group NSG's single "Options", which peaked at number seven. He also released Wayne's World 3 in 2019.

His single "Keisha & Becky" with fellow British rapper Russ Millions also reached the UK top 10, peaking at number seven. In 2020, Odunwo was featured, alongside rapper and singer Swarmz, and rapper KSI's single "Houdini". The single peaked at number six in the UK Singles Charts. Soon after that, he released his single "I Dunno" featuring Dutchavelli and Stormzy, which also reached the UK top 10, peaking at number seven.

In 2021, Tion Wayne released "Body", a second collaboration with Russ Millions. A remix was released on 22 April. The song charted at number 1 on the UK Singles Chart, becoming the first UK drill song to chart at number 1.

Controversies
On 4 March 2017, Odunwo was involved in a brawl outside a nightclub in Clifton, Bristol where he was among the performers who had been DJing at the venue. The brawl involved more than 100 people. Odunwo, along with three other men, were sentenced at Bristol Crown Court on 9 November. Odunwo was jailed for 16 months.

On 17 November 2020, Odunwo was involved in an altercation with rapper Headie One on board a flight from Dubai to London in which the rapper Morrisson tried to break up shortly after boarding.

Discography

Studio albums

Mixtapes

Singles

As lead artist

As featured artist

Other charted songs

Notes

References

1993 births
Living people
21st-century British rappers
English DJs
English people of Nigerian descent
English songwriters
Black British DJs
Black British male rappers
English male rappers
People from Edmonton, London
Rappers from London
UK drill musicians
Gangsta rappers
British male songwriters